Kenyatta University (KU) is a public research university with its main campus in Nairobi County, Kenya. It acquired the status of university in 1985, being the third university after University of Nairobi (1970) and Moi University (1984). As of October 2014, it was one of 23 public universities in the country.

Location

The list of KU campuses includes the following locations:

 Main Campus - Kahawa, Nairobi
 Ruiru Campus - Ruiru
 Parkland Campus - Parklands
 Kitui Campus - Kwa Vonza
 Mombasa Campus - Mombasa
 City Centre Campus - Nairobi Central Business District
 Nyeri Campus - Nyeri
 Nakuru Campus - Nakuru
 Kericho Campus - Kericho - Closed
 Dadaab Campus -Dadaab
 Embu Campus - Embu

The Arusha and Kigali campuses in Tanzania and Rwanda respectively were closed in 2018.

History
In 1965, the British government handed over the Templar Barracks in Kahawa, to the newly formed government of Kenya. The barracks were then converted into a college called Kenyatta College. In 1970, Kenyatta College became a constituent college of the University of Nairobi, and its name changed to Kenyatta University College, following an Act of Parliament.

In 1985, it was granted full university status and was renamed Kenyatta University.

U.S. President Barack Obama, whose late father, Barack Obama, Sr. (an economist) and paternal relatives are from Kenya, visited Kenya in 2015; while there, he visited the university's main campus.

Academics
As of March 2016, the university has 12 campuses offering bachelor's degrees, master's degrees, and doctoral degrees. The degrees awarded include those in medicine and law. The university has open-learning, e-learning which is known as the digital school, school-based, part-time and full-time teaching. Kenyatta University is accredited by the Kenya Commission of University Education, the Inter-University Council for East Africa, the Africa Association of Universities, the International Association of Universities and the Commonwealth Universities.

Library 

Kenyatta University's library is one of the largest in Africa and offers, scholarly information resources and services to its students and researchers. In addition to lending services, the library offers E-services and has branches in the respective satellite campuses.

Schools and institutes
, the university maintains the following schools:

Institutes and centers
The university hosts institutes and centers such as;
 Confucius Institute at Kenyatta University
 Africa Centre for Transformative and Inclusive Leadership (ACTIL)
 Chandaria Business Innovations and Incubation Centre (CBIIC)
 Center for Refugee Studies and Empowerment
 Cisco Networking Academy
 Centre for Entrepreneurship and Enterprise Development
 Center for International Programmes and Collaboration (CIPC)
 Centre for Gender Equity & Empowerment
 National Phytotherapeutics Research Centre

Degrees and courses 
The following courses are offered by the university and accredited by the Commission for University Education in Kenya (CUE)

Doctorates and PhD - 14

Master's degree - 94

Bachelor's degree - 117

Postgraduates Diploma - 12

Student life

International students
The Centre for International Programmes and Collaboration is a unit under the office of the Vice Chancellor, responsible for coordinating international activities, collaborations and linkages.

Athletics
Kenyatta University partnered with IAAF as an athletics-village in the 2017 world under 18 championship Nairobi. The athletes were hosted in the Nyayo hostels and used the campus facilities for training.

Kenyatta University offers the following disciplines:

Men's sports
Football, rugby, hockey, volleyball, netball, handball, basketball, tennis, table tennis, squash, badminton, chess, scrabble, darts, boxing, bodybuilding, taekwondo, swimming, athletics (track and field), scrabble, karate, Roll Ball, woodball, judo, wrestling, Goalball, baseball, softball.

Women's sports
Football, rugby, hockey, volleyball, netball, handball, basketball, tennis, table tennis, squash, badminton, chess, scrabble, darts, boxing, fitness modelling, Taekwondo, swimming, athletics (track and field), Scrabble, Karate, Roll Ball, woodball, Judo, goalball, baseball, softball Seminars Short – term Courses in coaching, Sports management, training and Sports leadership are offered.

Sports facilities

Sports achievements
 2012 - National Champions, Kenya University Women's Games
 2011 - National Champions, Kenya University Games
 2010 - 3rd Best University, East Africa University Games
 2009 - National Champions, Kenya University Games
 2006 - 6th Best University, East Africa University Games
 2004 - 2nd Best University, East Africa University Games

Alumni

The following individuals are some of the "prominent alumni" at the Kenyatta University website:
.
 Mwai Kibaki - former President of Kenya, 2002 to 2013
 Kalonzo Musyoka - former Vice president of Kenya
 Jakaya Kikwete - President of the United Republic of Tanzania, 2005 to 2015
 Daniel arap Moi - former President of Kenya, 1978 to 2002
 Benjamin Mkapa - former President of Tanzania, 1995 to 2005
 Daudi Kabaka - musician and band leader of Kenyatta University Band.
 Professor Joseph Maina Mungai  - former Vice-Chancellor, University of Nairobi
 Dr. Mostafa Tolba - former executive director of the United Nations Environment Programme
  Dr. Geoffrey William Griffin - founder director of Starehe Boys' Centre and School
 Dr. James Mwangi - managing director and chief executive officer, Equity Bank Group
  Dr. Eddah Gachukia - academic director, Riara Group of Schools
Esther Ngumbi – entomologist and winner of the 2018 Society for Experimental Biology Presidential Award
 

 Professor Michael Bernard Kwesi - professor, Department of Geography, Kenyatta University
 Professor John Mutio - former deputy vice chancellor for Academic Affairs, Kenyatta University
 Lawrence M. Mungai - former registrar of Kenyatta University College
 Professor James M. Waithaka - professor and deputy principal, Kenyatta University College
 Phillip Ndegwa - founding chairman, Kenyatta University Council, 1985 to 1994
 Onesmo K. ole-MoiYoi - former chairman, Kenyatta University Council, 1994 to 2010
  Dr. Harris Mule - former chancellor of Kenyatta University

Notable staff and professors
 Prof Mike Boit - sports science, former athlete. Received an honorary Doctorate of Science (DSc) from the University of Glasgow in recognition of his contributions to the academic research of sports and its development in Kenya 2014
 Ambassador Joseph Magutt Kenya's ambassador to the Republic of Germany
 Prof Olive Mugenda - former vice-chancellor (2009-2016), Board Chair KU hospital
 
 Prof Ahmed Hasanali - professor (Chemical Ecology & Bioprospecting), ICIPE
 Dr. Edward Waswa Kisiang'ani - historian, political analyst/scientist and strategist

Management

The chancellor is Benson Wairegi. The Vice Chancellor is Professor Waceke Wanjohi. He replaced Professor Paul Wainaina, who was suspended after a tussle with the government over the university's land.  Professor Wainaina had succeeded Professor Olive Mugenda, the first female Vice Chancellor of a public university in Kenya, who retired after the end of her tenure in January 2016. There are four Deputy Vice Chancellors and four Registrars, to assist the Vice Chancellor carry out his mandate.

The Deputy Vice Chancellors are:
 DVC Academic Affairs: Professor John Okumu
 DVC Administration: Professor Fatuma Chege
 DVC Finance and Development: Professor Godfrey Mse
 DVC Research, Innovation & Outreach: Professor F.Q Gravenir

Businesses and investments
The university owns and operates the following income-generating businesses and investments:

 Kenyatta University Funeral Home
 North Coast Beach Hotel - Mombasa
 Uni-City Shopping Mall & Office Complex - Nairobi
 Kenyatta University Conference Center - Nairobi (100 rooms)
 Kenyatta University Bookstore - Nairobi 
 Television station KUTV
 Kenyatta University Children's Hospital - Nairobi (Under construction)
 Kenyatta University Dairy Farm - (In development)
 Kenyatta University Hospital (KUH)

Gallery

References

External links

 
 Machakos University College website
 Pwani University college
 More information about Colleges and Universities in Kenya
 Leading Colleges and Universities in Kenya

 
Universities and colleges in Kenya
Education in Nairobi
Education in Mombasa
Educational institutions established in 1985
Jomo Kenyatta
1985 establishments in Kenya
1980s in Nairobi
Kiambu County